Islas Canarias  is a Spanish Denominación de Origen Protegida (DOP), traditionally called a Vino de calidad con Indicación Geográfica. This is one step below the mainstream Denominación de Origen quality wines and one step above the less stringent Vino de la Tierra wines on the quality ladder. It is encompasses all the Canary Islands. The Canary Islands also has ten individual DO's.

Authorised Grape Varieties
The authorised grape varieties are:

 Red: Vijariego Negro, Baboso Negro, Listán negro, Negramoll, Tintilla / Graciano

 White: Gual,  Listán Blanco, Malvasía, Marmajuelo, Moscatel, Vijariego blanco, Verdello (grape)

References

External links

 Islas Canarias DOP official website

Wine regions of Spain
Spanish wine
Appellations
Wine classification